Perdepoort Pass, Or just Perdepoort, is situated in the Eastern Cape, province, on the National road N9, between Willowmore and Graaff Reinet.

The mountain range it bridges has an elevation of 1.414 meter above sealevel.

Mountain passes of the Eastern Cape